Roop Rani was a Bharatiya Janata Party MLA in the Punjab Legislative Assembly representing Dina Nagar from 1997 to 2002 and was succeeded by Aruna Chaudhary.

References

Living people
Punjabi people
Bharatiya Janata Party politicians from Punjab
Punjab, India MLAs 1997–2002
Year of birth missing (living people)
Place of birth missing (living people)